Cure is a surname, and may refer to:

 Alfred Capel-Cure (1826–1896), British Army officer and photography pioneer
 Amy Cure (born 1992), Australian track cyclist 
 Carlos Cure (born 1944), Colombian diplomat  
 Cornelius Cure (died 1607), English sculptor 
 Henry de Cure (born 1993), Australian wheelchair tennis player
 Nigel Capel-Cure (1908–2004), English cricketer

See also
Cure (disambiguation)